Laohekou is a county-level city in the northwest of Hubei province, People's Republic of China. It is located on the Han River (Hanshui), near the Henan border.

It falls under the jurisdiction of Xiangyang City.

Before the Communist Revolution, the city was the seat of the Roman Catholic Bishop of Laohekou.

Geography and Climate

Laohekou has a monsoon-influenced, four season humid subtropical climate (Köppen Cfa), with cold, damp (but comparatively dry), winters, and hot, humid summers. A majority of the annual precipitation of  occurs from June to September. With monthly percent possible sunshine ranging from 33% in January to 46% in August, the city receives 1,762 hours of bright sunshine annually; January thru March is the cloudiest period of the year.

Administrative divisions
Two subdistricts:
Guanghua Subdistrict, Zanyang Subdistrict

Seven towns:
Menglou, Zhulinqiao, Xueji, Zhangji, Xianrendu, Hongshanzui, Lilou

The only township is Yuanchong Township

Other areas:
Shucai Seed Stock Station, Baihuashan Forestry Area, Linmaoshan Forestry Area, Erfangying Seed Stock Station

Transport
Laohekou is served by the Hankou–Danjiangkou Railway and the Laohekou Airport.

References

External links
 Official page

Cities in Hubei
County-level divisions of Hubei